Fiji Baby (2004) is the second studio album from New Zealand four piece Goodshirt.

Release information
New Zealand: February 2004 - (Cement/EMI)
Australia: September 2004 - (Cement/EMI)
Canada: February 2005 - (Cement/EMI)

Track listing
 Not That Far
 Sand
 Buck It Up
 Dumb Day
 Cement
 My Racing Head
 How Will I See You
 Cold Body Blues
 Lucy
 Fall
 Fiji Baby

Goodshirt albums
2004 albums